Martín Andrés Melconian Álvez (born 2 January 1990) is a Uruguayan swimmer. He competed in the men's 100 metre breaststroke event at the 2016 Summer Olympics. His brother Gabriel Melconian is also an Olympic freestyler swimmer.

In 2019, he represented Uruguay at the 2019 World Aquatics Championships held in Gwangju, South Korea and he competed in the men's 50 metre breaststroke and men's 100 metre breaststroke events.

References

External links
 

1990 births
Living people
Uruguayan male swimmers
Olympic swimmers of Uruguay
Swimmers at the 2016 Summer Olympics
Place of birth missing (living people)
South American Games bronze medalists for Uruguay
South American Games medalists in swimming
Competitors at the 2010 South American Games
Swimmers at the 2011 Pan American Games
Swimmers at the 2015 Pan American Games
Swimmers at the 2019 Pan American Games
Male breaststroke swimmers
Pan American Games competitors for Uruguay
20th-century Uruguayan people
21st-century Uruguayan people